= Nikon Ohi Factory =

- Built: 1918
- Location: Ōi, Tokyo, Japan
- Coordinates: 35°36′09″N 139°43′32.34″E
- Industry: Optical/Photographic
- Products: Cameras
- Address: 6-3, Nishiōi 1-chōme, Shinagawa-ku, Tokyo 140-8601

Nikon's Ohi plant in the Ōi district of Shinagawa, Tokyo was first built in 1918 after the formation of Nippon Kogaku K.K. in 1917. Nikon's first camera, the Nikon (1946) was made in this plant. Early cameras like the Nikon I (1948), Nikon M (1949), Nikon S rangefinders and Nikon F and Nikon F2 were also made in this plant. The development of specialized cameras for NASA's space program was also carried out at the Ohi plant.
